Dona Emma is a municipality in the state of Santa Catarina in the South region of Brazil.

Notable people
 Hungarian born Alexander Lenard (medic, writer), who translated A. A. Milne's Winnie the Pooh into Latin, lived here.

See also
List of municipalities in Santa Catarina

References

Municipalities in Santa Catarina (state)